Shannon Branch is a stream in Audrain County in the U.S. state of Missouri.

Shannon Creek bears the name of a pioneer settler.

See also
List of rivers of Missouri

References

Rivers of Audrain County, Missouri
Rivers of Missouri